Kermani may refer to:

 Kermani (surname)
 Kermani, Kerman, a village in Kerman Province, Iran
 Kermani, Yazd, a village in Yazd Province, Iran

See also
 Kamani (disambiguation)
 Kirmani